The 2017 BWF Super Series, officially known as 2017 Metlife BWF Super Series for sponsorship reasons, was the eleventh season of the BWF Super Series of badminton. It was replaced by the BWF World Tour from the 2018 season.

Schedule
Below is the schedule released by the Badminton World Federation:

Results

Winners

Performance by countries
Tabulated below are the Super Series performances based on countries. Only countries who have won a title are listed:

Finals

All England

India

Malaysia

Singapore

Indonesia

Australia

Korea

Japan

Denmark

France

China

Hong Kong

Finals

References

 
Super Series Premier and Super Series
BWF Super Series